Harrison's Principles of Internal Medicine is an American textbook of internal medicine. First published in 1950, it is in its 21st edition (published in 2022 by McGraw-Hill Professional ) and comes in two volumes. Although it is aimed at all members of the medical profession, it is mainly used by internists and junior doctors in this field, as well as medical students. It is widely regarded as one of the most authoritative books on internal medicine and has been described as the "most recognized book in all of medicine."

The work is named after Tinsley R. Harrison of Birmingham, Alabama, who served as editor-in-chief of the first five editions and established the format of the work: a strong basis of clinical medicine interwoven with an understanding of pathophysiology.

History
It was published in 1950 by Blakiston. Creator and editor Tinsley Harrison's quotation appeared on the first edition of this book in 1950:  Blakiston was acquired by McGraw-Hill in 1954.
The 17th edition of the textbook is dedicated to George W. Thorn, who was editor of the first seven editions of the book and editor in chief of the eighth edition. He died in 2004.

The 18th edition of the book was edited by  Anthony Fauci, Dennis Kasper, Stephen Hauser, J. Larry Jameson and Joseph Loscalzo. New chapters added include "Systems Biology in Health and Disease," "The Human Microbiome," "The Biology of Aging," and "Neuropsychiatric Illnesses in War Veterans."

The 19th edition of the book was edited by Dennis Kasper, Anthony Fauci, Stephen Hauser, Dan Longo, J. Larry Jameson and Joseph Loscalzo.

AL.com in December 2014 wrote that it was still "a best-selling internal medicine text in the United States and around the world," and that it had been reprinted 16 times and translated into 14 languages.

The 20th edition of the book, edited by Dennis Kasper, Anthony Fauci, Stephen Hauser, Dan Longo, J. Larry Jameson and Joseph Loscalzo, was released on 17 August 2018.

The 21st edition of the book was released on 28 March 2022.

Contents

Editors
The following is the list of editors, showing which editions they were an editor. Shaded boxes denote the chief editor of that edition.

See also
Clinical Information Access Portal
List of medical textbooks

References

External links

Harrison's Online, featuring the complete contents of Harrison's Principles of Internal Medicine, 18th Edition

1950 non-fiction books
Medical manuals